This is a list of prominent people who were born in or lived for a significant period in U.S. state of South Dakota. For a larger list by location, see People from South Dakota.

Academia

Vine Deloria Jr., American Indian author, theologian, historian, and activist
Alvin Hansen, economist, Harvard professor; born in Viborg
Arthur Larson, law professor, United States Undersecretary of Labor; born in Sioux Falls
Ernest O. Lawrence, inventor of cyclotron, winner of 1939 Nobel Prize for Physics; born in Canton
Lawrence Lessig, internet activist, Harvard Law School professor; born in Rapid City
Brad L. Neiger, public health professor, associate academic vice president; born in Eureka
Theodore Schultz, economist, winner of 1979 Nobel Prize for Economics; born in Arlington

Actors and filmmakers 

 Angela Aames (1956–1988), actress; born in Pierre
 Catherine Bach (born 1954), actress; grew up in South Dakota
 Bruce Baillie (1931–2020), experimental filmmaker; born in Aberdeen
 Rachael Bella (born 1984), actress; born in Vermillion
 Shannon Bolin (1917–2016), actress, singer; born in Spencer
 Moses Brings Plenty (born 1969), actor; born on the Pine Ridge Indian Reservation
 Christopher Cain (born 1943), actor, director, screenwriter; born in Sioux Falls
 Leslie Carlson (1933–2014), actor; born in Mitchell
 Sean Covel(born 1976),film producer; grew up in Edgemont
 Harvey B. Dunn (1894–1968), actor; born in Yankton
 Judith Evelyn (1913–1967), actress; born in Seneca
 Amy Hill (born 1953), actress; born in Deadwood
 Candace Hilligoss (born 1935), actress; born in Huron
 Ron Holgate (born 1937), actor; opera singer; born in Aberdeen
 January Jones (born 1978), actress; born in Hecla
 Cheryl Ladd (born 1951), actress; born in Huron
 Eddie Little Sky (1926–1997), actor; born on the Pine Ridge Indian Reservation
 Cliff Lyons (1901–1974), stuntman, actor; born in Lake County
 Beth Maitland (born 1958), actress; born in Rapid City
 Gail Matthius (born 1953), actress, voice actress; born in Sioux Falls
 Russell Means (1939–2012), actor, left-wing activist; born in Wanblee
 John Miljan (1892–1960), actor; born in Lead City
 Debra Mooney (born 1947), actress; born in Aberdeen
 Conrad A. Nervig (1889–1980), Oscar-winning film editor; born in Grant County
 Gary Owens (1934–2015), voice actor, disc jockey; born in Mitchell
 Dorothy Provine (1937–2010), actress, singer, dancer, comedian; born in Deadwood
 Gene Roth (1903–1976), actor; born in Redfield
 Chic Sale (1885–1936), actor, vaudevillian; born in Huron
 Eddie Spears (born 1982), actor; born in Lower Brulé Tribe, South Dakota
 Michael Spears (born 1977), actor; born in Lower Brulé Tribe, South Dakota
 Michael Steinberg (born 1959), director, writer; born in Rapid City
 Joan Tabor (1932–1968), actress; born in Sioux Falls
 Delores Taylor (1939–2018), actress, writer, director; born in Winner
 Casey Tibbs (1929–1990), cowboy, rodeo performer, actor; born in Fort Pierre
 Mamie Van Doren (born 1931), actress; born in Rowena
 Jerry verDorn (1949-2022), actor; born in Sioux Falls
 John War Eagle (1901–1991), actor; born on the Yankton Indian Reservation
 Alfred L. Werker (1896–1975), director; born in Deadwood
 Floyd Red Crow Westerman (1936–2007), actor, left-wing activist; born on the Lake Traverse Indian Reservation
 Timmy Williams (born 1981), actor, comedian; born in Watertown

Artists 
 Peggy Detmers, sculptor of wildlife in metal, attended South Dakota State
 Harvey Dunn, painter, born in Manchester
 James Earle Fraser, sculptor; spent much of his life in Mitchell
 Paul Goble, author and illustrator of children's books; lives in Rapid City
 Mary GrandPré, illustrator, born in South Dakota
 Bill Groethe, photographer, born in Rapid City
 Oscar Howe (1915–1983), Native American artist; born in South Dakota
 Terry Redlin (1937–2016), wildlife artist; born in Watertown
 Dick Termes, painter of Termespheres; lives in Spearfish

Authors and poets

 Jacob M. Appel, author, wrote Coulrophobia & Fata Morgana while living in Sioux Falls
 L. Frank Baum (1856–1919) author; lived in Aberdeen
 Joseph Bottum (born 1959), essayist and poet; born in Vermillion
 Charles Badger Clark (1883–1957), poet laureate of South Dakota
 Allison Hedge Coke (born 1958), American Book Award-winning poet, writer; South Dakota resident
 Elizabeth Cook-Lynn (born 1930), author; born in Fort Thompson
 Pete Dexter (born 1943), author, screenwriter and journalist, attended University of South Dakota
 David Allan Evans (born 1940), poet laureate of South Dakota
 Joseph Hansen (1923–2004), author, best known for mystery novels; born in Aberdeen
 Cameron Hawley (1905–1969), author, Executive Suite, Cash McCall; born in Howard
 Patrick Hicks (born 1970), novelist and poet, Writer-in-Residence at Augustana University
 Johan Andreas Holvik (1880–1960), author and professor at Concordia College (Minnesota)
 Adam Johnson (born 1967), writer, author of The Orphan Master's Son (2012); born in South Dakota, Lakota heritage
 Bill Johnson (born late 1950s), science-fiction writer; born in South Dakota
 Herbert Arthur Krause (1905–1976), historian, professor at Augustana
 Rose Wilder Lane (1886–1968), journalist, travel writer, novelist; born in De Smet
 Gaylord Larsen (born 1932), mystery writer; born in Canova
 Joseph Marshall III, Pen Award-winning author; co-founder of Sinte Gleska College; born on the Rosebud Indian Reservation
 Laura Ingalls Wilder (1867–1957), author, best known for Little House on the Prairie; lived in De Smet

Business 

 Gene Amdahl (1922–2015), chief architect of IBM mainframe computer; born in Flandreau
 Al Neuharth (1924–2013), founder of USA Today, born in Eureka
 Lee Raymond (born 1938), CEO and chairman of ExxonMobil Corporation; born in Watertown
 Joseph Robbie, owned NFL's Miami Dolphins; born in Sisseton

Military 
 Oscar Randolph Fladmark (1922–1955), WWII and Korean War pilot; Distinguished Flying Cross recipient; lived in Sioux Falls, born in Moe
 David C. Jones (1921–2013), retired U.S. Air Force general, former Chairman Joint Chiefs of Staff; born in Aberdeen
 Touch the Clouds (c. 1837–1905), Native American chief; later Indian Scout and Sergeant in the US army

Music 
 Joey Clement, band member of Selena Gomez & the Scene; born in Rapid City
 Shawn Colvin (born 1956), Grammy Award-winning musician; born in Vermillion
 Mark Craney (1952–2005), drummer for Jethro Tull, Jean Luc-Ponty, Eric Burdon
 Myron Floren (1919–2005), accordionist, The Lawrence Welk Show; born in Roslyn
 Gary Mule Deer (born 1940), comedian and country musician; born in Deadwood, lives in Spearfish
 Keith Olsen (1945–2020), record producer and sound engineer; born in Sioux Falls
 Jess Thomas (1927–1993), opera singer; born in Hot Springs
 Frank Waln, Sicangu Lakota rapper
 Abby Whiteside (1881–1956), piano teacher, attended University of South Dakota

Native Americans 

 Gertrude Bonnin (Zitkala-Sa) (1876–1938), Lakota writer and activist; born on Yankton Sioux Reservation
 Crazy Horse (c. 1840–1877), Oglala Lakota war leader
 Russell Means (1939–2012), Native American activist; born in Pine Ridge
 Maria Pearson (1932–2003), Yankton Sioux activist who helped establish the Native American Graves Protection and Repatriation Act
 Rain-in-the-Face (c. 1835–1905), Hunkpapa Lakota chief
 Red Cloud (1822–1909), Oglala Lakota chief
 Sitting Bull (c. 1831–1890), Hunkpapa Lakota chief
 Touch the Clouds (c. 1837–1905), Miniconjou Teton Lakota chief known for his great size
 Floyd "Red Crow" Westerman (1936–2007), musician, activist and actor; born on Sisseton-Wahpeton Dakota Sioux reservation

Politics and government 

 Jim Abdnor (1923–2012), second Lebanese U.S. Representative and Senator; born in Kennebec
 James Abourezk (born 1931), first Lebanese U.S. Representative and Senator; born in Wood
 Clinton Presba Anderson, U.S. Secretary of Agriculture; born in Centerville
 Tom Daschle (born 1947), U.S. Majority Leader of United States Senate; born in Aberdeen
 J. James Exon (1921–2005), U.S. senator for Nebraska, Governor of Nebraska; born in Geddes
 Joe Foss (1915–2003), Medal of Honor recipient, 20th Governor of South Dakota, first Commissioner of the American Football League; born in Sioux Falls
 Ralph A. Gamble (1885–1959), U.S. Representative for New York; born in Yankton
 John Hamre (born 1950), U.S. Deputy Secretary of Defense; born in Watertown
 Hubert Humphrey (1911–1978), U.S. Senator, 38th Vice President of the U.S., 1968 Democratic presidential candidate; born in Wallace
 Muriel Humphrey Brown, U.S. Senator from Minnesota, Second Lady of the United States born in Huron
 Bill Janklow (1939–2012), Governor 1979–1987 and 1995–2003; moved as teen to Flandreau
 Brendan Johnson (born 1975), 40th U.S. Attorney for the District of South Dakota; born in Vermillion
 Tim Johnson (born 1946), U.S. Senator from South Dakota 1997–2015; born in Canton
 Arthur Larson (1910–1993), United States Under Secretary of Labor, lawyer, law professor; born in Sioux Falls
 George McGovern (1922–2012), U.S. Senator from South Dakota, 1972 Democratic presidential candidate; born in Avon
 Karl E. Mundt (1900–1974), U.S. Senator and U.S. Representative; born in Humboldt
 Kristi Noem (born 1971), first female Governor of South Dakota and U.S. Representative from South Dakota; born in Watertown
 Larry Pressler (born 1942), three-term U.S. Senator from South Dakota; born in Humboldt
 Gladys Pyle (1890–1989), first female U.S. Senator from South Dakota; born in Huron
 Mike Rounds (born 1954), current U.S. Senator from South Dakota, former Governor; born in Huron
 Stephanie Herseth Sandlin (born 1970), U.S. Representative from South Dakota; born in Houghton
 Edward John Thye (1896–1969), U.S. Senator from Minnesota and 26th Governor of Minnesota; born in Frederick

Science 
 Bob Burris (1914–2010),  biochemist; elected to the NAS; contributed to our understanding of biological nitrogen fixation; born in Brookings
 Niels Ebbesen Hansen (1866–1950), horticulturist and botanist
 Ernest O. Lawrence (1901–1958), physicist, Nobel Prize winner, built first cyclotron; born in Canton
 John Mortvedt (1932–2012), agronomist and soil scientist who was the world's leading expert on micronutrients; born and raised on a farm near Dell Rapids

Sports 

 Sparky Anderson (1934–2010), Baseball Hall of Fame manager of Cincinnati Reds and Detroit Tigers; born in Bridgewater
 Michael Andrew (born 1999), Olympic swimmer; raised in Aberdeen
 Shayna Baszler (born 1980), mixed martial artist; born in Sioux Falls
 James Bausch (1906–1974), athlete, decathlon gold medalist at 1932 Summer Olympics; born in Marion
 Curt Byrum (born 1958), professional golfer, PGA Tour; Onida
 Tom Byrum (born 1960), professional golfer, PGA Tour, PGA Tour Champions; Onida
 Dallas Clark (born 1979), tight end for the Tampa Bay Buccaneers; born in Sioux Falls
 Dave Collins, baseball player; born in Rapid City
 Jessi Combs (1980–2019), professional racer, female land-speed world record holder, and TV personality; born in Rockerville 
 Sean Doolittle (born 1986), baseball player; born in Rapid City
 Justin Duchscherer (born 1977), baseball player; born in Aberdeen
 Mark Ellis (born 1977), baseball player; Rapid City
 Keith Foulke (born 1972), baseball player, relief pitcher for 2004 World Series champion Boston Red Sox; born on Air Force base in South Dakota
 Terry Francona (born 1959), baseball player, manager of the Boston Red Sox and Cleveland Indians; born in Aberdeen
 Chad Greenway (born 1983), linebacker for the Minnesota Vikings; born in Mount Vernon
 Marlene Hagge (born 1934), golfer, member of World Golf Hall of Fame; born in Eureka
 Becky Hammon (born 1977), basketball player and coach; born in Rapid City
 Clare Jacobs (1886–1971), athlete, pole vault bronze medalist in 1908 Olympics; born in Madison
 Dennis Koslowski (born 1959), Greco-Roman wrestler, two-time Olympic medalist;  born in Watertown
 Duane Koslowski (born 1959), Greco-Roman wrestler, former Olympian; born in Watertown
 Jason Kubel (born 1982), outfielder for the Arizona Diamondbacks; born in Belle Fourche
 Ward Lambert (1888–1958), college basketball coach; born in Deadwood
 Ben Leber, football player; attended high school in Vermillion
 Brock Lesnar (born 1977), UFC fighter and WWE professional wrestler; born in Webster
 Randy Lewis (born 1959), freestyle wrestler, 1984 Los Angeles Olympics gold medalist; born in Rapid City
 Clarence "Pug" Manders (1913–1985), pro football running back; born in Milbank
 Jack Manders (1909–1977), pro football running back; born in Milbank
 Mike Martz (born 1951), former NFL head coach and offensive coordinator; born in Sioux Falls
 Lincoln McIlravy (born 1974), freestyle wrestler, 2000 Sydney Olympics bronze medalist; born in Rapid City
 David Michaud (born 1988), UFC fighter; born in Pine Ridge
 Derek Miles (born 1972), Olympic pole vaulter; from Tea
 Tim Miles (born 1966), Big Ten basketball coach; born in Huron
 Mike Miller (born 1980), pro basketball player; born in Mitchell
 Billy Mills (born 1938), athlete, gold medalist in 1964 Olympics; born in Pine Ridge
 Dale Moss (born 1988), football player and model; born in Brandon
 Gene Okerlund (1942-2019), Professional wrestling commentator; born in Brookings
 Eric Piatkowski (born 1970), pro basketball player; attended high school in Rapid City
 Riley Reiff, football player for Minnesota Vikings; from Parkston
 Jared Reiner, basketball player; from Tripp
 Bill Scherr (born 1961), freestyle wrestler, World Champion, four-time World medalist and Olympic bronze medalist; born in Eureka
 Wilbur Thompson (1921–2013), athlete, 1948 Summer Olympics gold medalist in shot put; born in Frankfort
 Derrek Tuszka (born 1997), pro football linebacker for the Denver Broncos; born in Warner, SD
 Shane Van Boening (born 1983), Professional pool player; born in Rapid City
 Norm Van Brocklin (1926–1983), football player; born in Eagle Butte
 Adam Vinatieri (born 1972), NFL placekicker; born in Yankton
 Brandon Wegher (born 1990), football player; born in Dakota Dunes

Television 

 Bob Barker (born 1923), television game show host; raised on the Rosebud Indian Reservation
 Tom Brokaw (born 1940), television journalist, former NBC Nightly News anchor; born in Webster
 Don Fedderson (1913–1994), television producer and creator, My Three Sons, Family Affair, The Millionaire; born in Beresford
 Mary Hart (born 1950), television personality (Entertainment Tonight); from Madison, and Sioux Falls
 Chelsea Houska (born 1991), television personality (Teen Mom 2)
 Tomi Lahren (born 1992), conservative political commentator, host of TheBlaze's Tomi; raised in Rapid City
 Pat O'Brien (born 1948), sports commentator, television personality (Access Hollywood); born in Sioux Falls
 Gary Owens (1934–2015), announcer for Rowan & Martin's Laugh-In, radio disc jockey, voice actor; born in Mitchell

Uncategorized

 Helen Morton Barker, social reformer
 Gutzon Borglum, sculptor of Mount Rushmore
 Seth Bullock, first sheriff of Deadwood
 K. G. William Dahl (1883–1917), Lutheran pastor, author and social advocate
 Billy Etbauer, rodeo cowboy; born in Huron
 Alvin Hansen, economist; born in Viborg
 Wild Bill Hickok, Wild West lawman; lived in Deadwood
 Calamity Jane, Wild West figure; lived in Deadwood
 Frank Leahy, Notre Dame football coach; attended school in Winner
 Lawrence Lessig, political activist; from Rapid City
 Boyd McDonald, pornographer
 Vernon C. Miller, outlaw and Huron lawman
 Peter Norbeck, South Dakota governor and senator
 William H. Parker, longtime Los Angeles police chief; born in Lead
 James "Scotty" Philip, rancher
 James Edward Zimmerman, inventor; born in Lantry
 Korczak Ziółkowski, sculptor of Crazy Horse Memorial

See also

 List of people from Rapid City, South Dakota
List of South Dakota suffragists
 List of University of South Dakota people

References

Lists of people from South Dakota